Thomas W. Forster   (May 1, 1859 – July 17, 1946) was an American professional baseball player who played second base in 1882 for the Detroit Wolverines of the National League and from 1884–1886 for the Pittsburgh Alleghenys and New York Metropolitans of the American Association.

External links

Baseball players from New York (state)
Detroit Wolverines players
Pittsburgh Alleghenys players
New York Metropolitans players
19th-century baseball players
1859 births
1946 deaths
Major League Baseball second basemen
Washington Nationals (minor league) players
Albany (minor league baseball) players
New York New Yorks players
New York Quicksteps players
East Saginaw Grays players
Saginaw Greys players
Milwaukee Brewers (minor league) players
Milwaukee Cream Citys players
Davenport Onion Weeders players
Milwaukee Creams players
Hartford (minor league baseball) players